Giannis Sfakianakis (born 6 February 1976) is a Greek professional football defender who has played for several clubs in Greece and Cyprus.

Career
Born in Glyfada, Sfakianakis began playing professional football with Doxa Vyronas F.C. in 1993. He had a loan spell at Panegialios F.C. in 1996, before transferring to Athinaikos F.C. in 1999.

Sfakianakis helped Athinaikos gain promotion to the Greek Superleague for the 2000–01 season. The club were relegation and he left after a season in the second division. Next, he would play for Kerkyra F.C. and Akratitos F.C. in the Superleague and had a brief spell with Panachaiki in 2005. He moved to Cyprus for the five seasons with AEP Paphos F.C., APOP Kinyras FC, Apollon Limassol FC and Atromitos Yeroskipou, where he would win the 2008–09 Cypriot Cup and 2009–10 Cypriot Cup.

In June 2011, Sfakianakis returned to Greece to play with Corfu-based Cassiopi F.C. in the regional leagues.

Honours
APOP Kinyras
 Cypriot Cup: 2008–09

References

External links
Profile at Guardian Football

1976 births
Living people
Association football defenders
Athinaikos F.C. players
Greek expatriate footballers
A.O. Kerkyra players
Panachaiki F.C. players
A.P.O. Akratitos Ano Liosia players
AEP Paphos FC players
APOP Kinyras FC players
Apollon Limassol FC players
Atromitos Yeroskipou players
AEK Kouklia F.C. players
Cypriot First Division players
Cypriot Second Division players
Expatriate footballers in Cyprus
Panegialios F.C. players
Doxa Vyronas F.C. players
Footballers from Athens
Greek footballers